Paraguay–Taiwan relations, also known as Sino–Paraguayan relations or Paraguayan–Taiwanese relations are foreign relations between the Republic of Paraguay and the Republic of China (Taiwan). Both governments established diplomatic relations on 8 July 1957.

Paraguay conforms to the One-China policy and is one of the 13 countries in the world (and the only one in South America) that recognized the ROC as the sole legitimate government of "China". Paraguay has had an embassy in Taipei since 1999. Taiwan has an Embassy in Asunción and a Consulate-General in Ciudad del Este.

The two are antipodes of each other. The ROC is also the second state in  Asia (after Japan) to have diplomatic relations with Paraguay. In Public Media, the relationship between the two countries has been described as a historic friendship. Paraguay's and Taiwan's relationship endured principally because of millions of donations and loans, this method of relationship, however, fell into discredit of suspicious corruption, being criticized those who are in charge of today's government.

History

The governments of Paraguay and the Republic of China established diplomatic relations on July 8, 1957, as the sole legal government of China. Over the following decades, the two governments signed the Cultural Convention (1961),  Treaty of Friendship (1968), and Conventions of Tourism and Investments (1975).
 When Paraguay and Taiwan began relations, Alfredo Stroessner ordered the construction of a statue of Taiwanese leader Chiang Kai-Shek as a showing of friendship.

The partnership between the anti-communist governments of General Alfredo Stroessner and Generalissimo Chiang Kai-shek was quite natural. 
Many Paraguayan officers went for training in Fu Hsing Kang College in Taiwan.

The ouster of Stroessner in 1989,  and his successor Andrés Rodríguez's reinventing himself as a democratically elected president, were immediately followed by invitations from the People's Republic of China to switch diplomatic recognition. However,  the experienced general and politician  Wang Sheng who happened to serve as Taiwan's ambassador at the time, and his diplomatic staff, were able to convince the Paraguayans that continuing the relationship with ROC, and thus keeping Taiwan's development assistance and access to Taiwan's markets, would be more advantageous for Paraguay. As the ROC Commercial Attaché at Asunción, Tseng Cheng-te, explained later, "I tried constantly to figure out what we could buy from them. It was very difficult, because they have nothing to offer".

1990s
Taiwan (ROC) provided assistance to Paraguay on a number of economic development projects throughout the 1990s,
and has extended large loans to Paraguay; as of early 2009, Taiwan's government was offering payment deferral on a $400 million outstanding loan.

The bilateral relationship has been increasingly affected by China's economic growth and its rigid approach to the One China Policy. The People's Republic of China is a major buyer of Paraguay's major exports, especially soy and beef. It has also made large investments in those sectors, directly affecting the Paraguayan economy. This has led to increasingly prominent debates within Paraguay over recognition policy. "While commercial ties increase, China may be gaining other forms of leverage over Paraguay; pro-China rumblings surfaced in late 2019 largely from meat producers whose market can be curtailed through phytosanitary regulations."

2000s
Paraguay's UN General Assembly sessions for the return of the Republic of China into the United Nations' Organization. However, in the fall of 2008, the recently elected Paraguyan president Fernando Lugo (whose inauguration, just a few days previously, had been attended by Taiwan's Ma Ying-jeou) announced that his country would not do so at the 63rd annuals session of the General Assembly.

2010s
In 2010, when Paraguay president Fernando Lugo planned to establish diplomatic relations with China, it meant that it had to break with Taiwan. Lugo already commented in 2008 that existed an intense commercial relation, even without a China Embassy in Paraguay. In 2010, this though lead to China not wishing to recognize Paraguay's relationship with Taiwan and leaving Paraguay to choose between one of the two countries.

Under President Mario Abdo Benítez, in office since August 2018, Paraguay has emphasized a pro-Taiwan policy while also seeking commercial opportunities with the PRC. "He has emphasized a desire to expand commercial relations with PRC, 'always respecting our historic friendship with Taiwan'."

In 2018, Paraguay was the last South American country that still recognised Taiwan.

2020s
In May 2021, Paraguay was one of 15 countries that maintained diplomatic relations with Taiwan.

In January 2023, Efrain Alegre, presidential candidate for the 2023 Paraguayan general election, told Reuters that in case he wins the election in April, Paraguay would cut Taiwan ties and open relations with China, hoping to boost Paraguay's soy and beef exports.

Free Trade Agreement
In 2004, Taiwan and Paraguay attempted to negotiate a free trade agreement, but having to obtain approval from Paraguay's MERCOSUR's partners (none of which has diplomatic relations with Taiwan) made the process difficult.
Since 27 February 2018, the free trade agreement has entered into effect.

Contestation within Paraguay 
In recent years, the bilateral relationship has been the subject of growing contention in Paraguay. Long and Urdinez note that the PRC's growth increased Paraguay's opportunity costs, especially in the form of lost loans and investments from mainland China during the commodities boom. However, Taiwan continued to enjoy support from many Paraguayan policymakers. In response to arguments that recognizing the People's Republic was economically necessary, "Key Paraguayan elites have proactively pushed back against the idea that a change in recognition is inevitable or beneficial." On April 17, 2020, in the midst of the COVID-19 pandemic, a group of Paraguayan senators advanced a bill to urge the president to shift Paraguay's recognition of China from Taipei to Beijing. The proposal was defeated 25–16. Proponents argued that the PRC would provide greater medical aid to Paraguay, something the ROC contested by increasing its own provision of assistance after declaring that they would suspend relations between the countries. The vote followed growing political pressure within Paraguay, especially from ranchers seeking greater access to the Chinese market for their beef exports.

High level visits

See also
 Foreign relations of Paraguay
 Foreign relations of Taiwan

References

External links
  Paraguayan Ministry of Foreign Relations about relations with Taiwan
 Embassy of Taiwan in Asunción
 Embassy of Paraguay in Taipei

Taiwan
Bilateral relations of Taiwan